"Turn It Down" is a song by the British glam rock band the Sweet, from their 1974 album Desolation Boulevard. The song was removed from the US version of Desolation Boulevard however, along with two other songs. "Turn It Down" was the second single released from the album. In the UK, the single reached number 41 on the charts but fared better in Europe, reaching the top five in Norway and Germany.

Style  
Writing in 2018, Simon Philio proclaimed "Turn It Down" to be "proto-glam metal" in style.

Controversy
"Turn It Down" was banned by the BBC due to its subject nature, and because it contained the words "for God's sake".

Personnel
Brian Connolly – lead vocals 
Steve Priest – bass, backing vocals
Andy Scott – guitars, backing vocals
Mick Tucker – drums, percussion, backing vocals

Charts

References

1974 songs
The Sweet songs
Songs written by Mike Chapman
Songs written by Nicky Chinn